A Fighting Colleen is a 1919 American silent comedy-drama film directed by David Smith and produced by Vitagraph Company of America. It stars Bessie Love and Charles Spere.

The film is presumed lost.

Plot 
Alannah Malone (Love), an Irish immigrant living in a tenement, who sells newspapers to make a living. When her mother dies, she engages in fistfights to defend her territory from newsboys. One particular newsboy (Spere) falls for her after she beats him up. The tenement in which Alannah lives is owned by the city's unjust mayor. When the District Attorney announces his candidacy for mayor, Alannah aids his campaign by gathering evidence to expose the mayor as a hypocrite.

Cast 
 Bessie Love as Alannah Malone
 Anne Schaefer as Mother Malone
 Charles Spere as Jimmy Meehan
 Jay Morley as Stanton Colby
 George Kunkel as Mortimer Wall
 Beulah Clark as Maggie O'Higgins

Reception 
Press for the film likened it to Mary Pickford's Daddy Long Legs and Mabel Normand's Mickey. The film received positive reviews, and did well at the box office.

References

External links 

 
 
 

1919 comedy-drama films
1919 lost films
1919 films
American black-and-white films
1910s English-language films
American silent feature films
Films directed by David Smith (director)
Films with screenplays by Gerald Duffy
Lost American films
Lost comedy-drama films
1910s American films
Silent American comedy-drama films